Heather Carroll is a Canadian/British multi-disciplinary artist who works primarily with engravings, relief printing, monotype, stone sculpting, serigraphy, and weaving.

She also works in the design, organization, and conducting of creative workshops for children and adults.

Biography 
Born in Manchester, England, UK in 1956 to Canadian and Scottish parents, Heather Carroll is a Kablunangajuk of Inuit, Innu, Scottish, and other European origin.  In 1977, she completed her Bachelor of Arts degree at the School of Fine Arts at the University of Toronto..  From 1983 to 1988, she pursued a career as a graphic artist and illustrator in Barbados with her company, Lâché, during which time she also gave courses in advertising design at the Barbados Community College.  In 1988, she moved to Brussels, Belgium where she worked as a freelance graphic artist.  In 1989, she moved to Canada where she began her work in engravings in her studio in Montreal, Quebec.  In 1990, Heather Carroll relocated to Luxembourg where she has since been continuing with her artwork and career as a multi-disciplinary artist as well as art instructor and lecturer.

Artwork 
She has been based in Luxembourg since 2000. She has exhibited in Luxembourg, Belgium, France, Germany, the Caribbean, Canada, the United States and China.

Her work focuses on the land of her ancestors and family, animals, the environment and the problems that threaten to change their lives forever.

She has monumental sculptures located throughout Luxembourg and France and has regularly participated in sculpture symposiums from 2004, 2005, and 2008 in Luxembourg and 2007 in Rodemack, France. Her last symposiums took place in Lunéville, France in May 2013 and in Luxembourg in August of the same year.

Carroll was commissioned by Canada's ambassador to the Netherlands to create a 5-tonne, 3.5-meter Inukshuk. This sculpture was donated to the International Criminal Court in The Hague and inaugurated on 7 March 2018.  She was also commissioned by the Canadian Embassy to create an Inukshuk for the city of Lahr, Germany for Canada's 150th anniversary, which is on display on the square in front of the city's train station.

Public Sculptures

Main Exhibitions

References 

1956 births
Living people